Euxesta undulata is a species of ulidiid or picture-winged fly in the genus Euxesta of the family Ulidiidae found in Paraguay. It was described by Hendel in 1913.

References

undulata
Fauna of Paraguay
Insects described in 1913